3-Mercaptopropionitrile is the organosulfur compound with the formula HSCH2CH2CN.  Containing both thiol and nitrile functional groups, it is a bifunctional compound.  A colorless liquid, the compound has found some use as a masked form of thiolate.

Preparation and reactions
it is typically prepared from 3-chloropropionitrile via initial reaction with thiourea.  The resulting isothiouronium salt hydrolyzes to the thiol.  A A variation on this preparation involves isolation of the disulfide (SCH2CH2CN)2.  Zinc reduction of this disulfide gives the thiol.

Thioethers derived from S-alkylation of 3-mercaptopropionitrile react with strong bases to give thiolate and acrylonitrile:
RSCH2CH2CN  +  KOBu-t  →  RSK  + CH2=CHCN  +  HOBu-t 
The conversion illustrates the retro-Michael reaction.  The thiolate is then hydrolyzed
RSK  +  H+  →  RSH  + K+

References

Nitriles
Thiols